Andy "Andro" Ernst is a music producer, engineer, musician, and songwriter from San Francisco.  Artists he has worked with include: Green Day, AFI, Sway & King Tech, Rancid, Tiger Army,  The Nerve Agents, Malo, Link 80, Screeching Weasel, Swingin' Utters, Screw 32, Good Riddance, Fury 66, Shock G and Money B. The majority of his work has been punk rock. Ernst owns and operates the Art of Ears Studio in Hayward, California, previously located in San Francisco.

Ernst was the lead singer/guitarist/songwriter for the band Diabolical Exploits, whose songs appeared in MTV's Jackass Vol. 2 DVD, and performed with AFI and Tsunami Bomb. He was also a member of Sass (1976), the Stats (1980), and Andro & Ross (1989). As a member of Sass, he has performed in concert along with Lionel Richie and the Commodores, Greg Kihn, Malo, Esther Phillips, Huey Lewis & Clover, the Main Ingredient,  Brass Construction, and Tower Of Power.

Ernst has acted in a number of independent films, including the 1989 production of the Frank Navarro film "Flask" with Aldo Ray.

Partial production discography
Sass- I Only Wanted to Love You / Do It (Single) (20th Century) (1976)
Andro & Ross- Should’ve Known Better / You're My Girl (12”) (Bogart) (1989)
Green Day- 1,000 Hours (EP)(Lookout)(1989)
Green Day- 39/Smooth (Lookout) (1990)
Green Day- Slappy (EP) (Lookout) (1990)
Mc Sway & Dj King Tech- Follow 4 Now (All City) (1990)
David Diebold & Kim Cataluna- White Rabbit (Megatone) (1990)
Sway & King Tech- Concrete Jungle (Giant) (1991)
Green Day- 1,039 / Smoothed Out Slappy Hours (Lookout) (1991)
Screeching Weasel- My Brain Hurts (Lookout) (1991)
Rancid- Rancid (EP) (Lookout) (1992)
Fifteen- Swain's First Bike Ride (Lookout) (1992)
Green Day- Kerplunk (Lookout) (1992)
Screeching Weasel- Anthem for a New Tomorrow (Lookout) (1993)
Nuisance- Sunny Side Down (Lookout) (1993)
Big Rig- Expansive Heart (EP) (Lookout) (1994)
Swingin' Utters- The Streets of San Francisco (New Red Archives) (1994)
Wynona Riders- J.D. Salinger (Lookout) (1995)
Screw 32- Unresolved Childhood Issues (Wingnut) (1995)
Screeching Weasel- Kill the Musicians (Lookout) (1995)
AFI- Answer That and Stay Fashionable (Wingnut) (1995)
The Hi-Fives-Welcome to my Mind (Lookout) (1995)
The B.U.M.S.- Lyfe’ n’ Tyme (Priority) (1995)
Malo- Senorita (Crescendo) (1995)
Go Sailor- Go Sailor (Lookout) (199?)
Good Riddance / Ignite (EP) (Revelation) (1996)
AFI-Shut Your Mouth and Open Your Eyes (Nitro) (1997)
Link 80- 17 Reasons (Asian Man) (1997)
The Hi-Fives- And a Whole Lotta You (Lookout) (1997)
The Force (band)- I Don't Like You Either (Spider Club) (1997)
Hayride to Hell- Hayride to Hell (Nervous) (1997)
Redemption 87- All Guns Poolside (1998)
West African Highlife Band- Salute to Highlife Pioneers (Inner Spirit) (1998)
Tiger Army- Tiger Army  (Hellcat) (1998)
Fred Ross- Dignity  (Strokeland) (1998)
AFI- A Fire Inside (EP) (Adeline) (1998)
Bottomdawg- Bound By Circumstance (1998)
78 RPM- Dill Records (1998)
AFI- All Hallow's EP (EP) (Nitro) (1999)
AFI- Black Sails in the Sunset (Nitro) (1999)
Link 80- The Struggle Continues (Asian Man) (1999)
The Missing 23rd- ctrl+alt+del (Sessions) (2000)
The Nerve Agents- Days Of The White Owl (Revelation) (2000)
The V-Town Have-Nots- Self-Untitled (2000)
The Nerve Agents- The Butterfly Collection (Hellcat) (2001)
AFI- The Art of Drowning (Nitro) (2000)
Prosper- Brevity of Man's Days (Bettie Rocket Records) (2000)
Tiger Army-  (Hellcat) (2001)
Groovie Ghoulies- Freaks On Parade (Stardumb) (2001)
Pipedown- Enemies of Progress (AF) (2001)
Fury 66- Red Giant Evolution (Sessions) (2001)
Jet Lag- Lonely Kings (Sessions) (2001)
Tilt- Been Where? Did What? (Fat Wreck Chords) (2001)
Nigerian Brothers- Sons from the Village (Inner Spirit) (2001)
Diabolical Exploits-  Diabolical Exploits (Substandard) (2001)
Dexter Danger - It's Not Pretty Being Easy EP (2002)
Dexter Danger - Forever Broken (2002)
Pipedown- Mental Weaponry (AF) (2003)
Said Radio- Tidal Waves and Teeth (Mankind) (2007)
Set Off- Just Please Stop Sceaming (Felony) (2007)
Set Off- Constructive Instability Vol. 1 (2009)
Batching It- Homage (2009)

References

External links
Art of Ears website
Ernst at Discogs website

Record producers from California
Living people
Companies based in Hayward, California
Year of birth missing (living people)